The Association for Heritage Interpretation (AHI) is a membership based organisation for people actively involved or concerned with heritage interpretation.

AHI began as the Society for the Interpretation of Britain’s Heritage in 1975 and later became the Association for Heritage Interpretation. It has a membership of over 400 interpreters from around the world. It is managed by an Executive Committee which meets four times a year and holds an AGM at the Annual Conference in the Autumn. AHI’s president was Lord Sandford (1920-2009) and its patron is Loyd Grossman.

The Association states that it:

AHI offers a focus for ideas, debate and networking. The association brings together people actively involved or concerned with interpretation of natural and cultural heritage. Some work as interpretation or heritage officers, park rangers or countryside managers, others as designers or illustrators, planners, teachers, curators, consultants, academics or people from many other professions with an interest in our environmental inheritance.

AHI publishes its journal Interpretation two times a year, produces bi-monthly newsletters and organises a series of training events each year. In 2007, AHI worked with Interpret Scotland to hold The Vital Spark Interpretation Conference in Aviemore, in 2017 AHI partnered with Interpret Europe to hold a joint conference in Inverness. The vibrant annual AHI conference is hosted in different venues across Britain and brings together interpreters to meet each other, present papers on interpretation practice and visit local visitor sites to see case studies of interpretation. Recent hosts have included Bournemouth, Cardiff, Newcastle and Shropshire.

Awards
The current iteration of the Awards are the Engaging People Awards.

The AHI offered Discover Heritage Awards in 2015, 2017 and 2019.

From 1984 to 2007 the Interpret Britain and Ireland Awards were awarded annually, "recognising innovative and inspiring interpretation".

References

External links 

Cultural heritage of the United Kingdom
Heritage organisations in the United Kingdom
1975 establishments in the United Kingdom
Organizations established in 1975
Heritage interpretation organizations